Jonathan Jerrod Hefney (born February 27, 1985 in Rock Hill, South Carolina) is a former Canadian Football Defensive Back. He was signed by the Tampa Bay Buccaneers as an undrafted free agent in 2008. He played college football at Tennessee.

Hefney has also been a member of the Philadelphia Eagles and Detroit Lions.

High-School Career
Hefney played high school football at Rock Hill High School in Rock Hill, South Carolina. He led his school to an undefeated record in 2002. Following his senior season, Hefney played at Hargrave Military Academy in Chatham, Virginia.

College career
Hefney was a four-year starter at either cornerback or safety during his time at Tennessee, starting every game except for the 2004 season opener against UNLV.  Hefney also garnered attention as a punt return specialist.

Professional career

Tampa Bay Buccaneers
Hefney was expected to be selected early in the 2008 NFL Draft but instead he went undrafted, and signed with the Tampa Bay Buccaneers. On July 25, 2008, he was released from the Buccaneers. Hefney was signed to the Philadelphia Eagles practice squad on September 9, 2008.

Winnipeg Blue Bombers
Failing to make an NFL team, the Winnipeg Blue Bombers of the CFL signed Hefney on May 28, 2009. He recorded 66 tackles and four interceptions his rookie season, earning Eastern Division Rookie of the Year and All-Star honors. However Hefney left the next year to play in the NFL again.

Detroit Lions
His time in the NFL that year was short however as Hefney was signed by the Detroit Lions on January 4, 2010, and released on September 4, 2010. He was re-signed to the practice squad on September 6, and released on September 23.

Winnipeg Blue Bombers (II)
He returned to the Blue Bombers four days after being released by the Detroit Lions. The 2011 Winnipeg Blue Bombers season saw Hefney as part of the self-titled "Swaggerville" defence that was arguably tops in the league. That season, Hefney won his second nod as a CFL East Division all-star, and was then named to his second CFL All-Star team a short time later. Hefney was named a CFL East Division all-star again in 2012. Just prior to the start of June 2013 training camp, Hefney was charged with marijuana possession in his home state of South Carolina. He was released by the Bombers on June 15, 2013. Hefney played three full seasons and parts of a fourth with the Winnipeg Blue Bombers.

Calgary Stampeders
On June 18, 2013, 3 days after being released by Winnipeg, Hefney signed with the Calgary Stampeders of the Canadian Football League He was released by the Stampeders on May 21, 2014.

Statistics

Personal life 
In September 2019 Hefney was sentenced to nine years in jail for trafficking cocaine.

References

External links

Philadelphia Eagles bio
Tampa Bay Buccaneers bio
Tennessee Volunteers bio
Winnipeg Blue Bombers bio

1985 births
Living people
American football cornerbacks
American football safeties
Players of Canadian football from South Carolina
Canadian football defensive backs
Canadian Football League Rookie of the Year Award winners
Canadian football linebackers
Detroit Lions players
People from Rock Hill, South Carolina
Philadelphia Eagles players
Players of American football from South Carolina
Tampa Bay Buccaneers players
Tennessee Volunteers football players
Winnipeg Blue Bombers players
Montreal Alouettes players
Rock Hill High School (South Carolina) alumni
Hargrave Military Academy alumni